The 1972 Commercial Union Assurance Masters was a tennis tournament played on indoor hard courts at Palau Blaugrana in Barcelona in Spain. It was the 3rd edition of the Masters Grand Prix and was held from 28 November through 2 December 1972. Ilie Năstase won the title.

Final

Singles

 Ilie Năstase defeated  Stan Smith 6–3, 6–2, 3–6, 2–6, 6–3
 It was Năstase's 18th title of the year and the 34th of his career.

See also
1972 World Championship Tennis Finals

References

 
Comm
Grand Prix tennis circuit year-end championships
Commercial Union Assurance Masters
Commercial Union Assurance Masters
Commercial Union Assurance Masters
Commercial Union Assurance Masters